Christian Daniel Fjeldsted (20 February 1829 – 23 December 1905; sometimes spelled Fjelsted) was a general authority of the Church of Jesus Christ of Latter-day Saints (LDS Church) from 1884 to his death. Fjelsted was one of the first Scandinavian converts to Mormonism and was a prominent Mormon missionary to his home country of Denmark and the other Scandinavian countries.

Fjeldsted was born in Sundbyvester in Copenhagen, Denmark. In 1851, he and his wife were taught about Mormonism from LDS Church missionary and apostle Erastus Snow. They became members of the LDS Church in 1852. The following year, he was ordained an elder in the church by Peter O. Hansen and he came to preside over districts of the church in Amager and Ålborg, Denmark and Christiania (now Oslo), Norway.

In 1858, Fjeldsted and his family emigrated to Utah Territory to join the gathering of Latter Day Saints in Salt Lake City. From 1867 to 1870, Fjeldsted served a church mission to Denmark and Norway. In 1884, he became a member of the church's First Seven Presidents of the Seventy. As a general authority of the church, Fjeldsted served two more missions to Scandinavia, including two terms as the president of the Scandinavian Mission of the church from 1888 to 1890 and from 1904 to 1905. Fjeldsted also served missions in northern Utah and in Chicago, Illinois among Scandinavian emigrants.

Shortly after returning to Utah from Scandinavia, Fjeldsted died in Salt Lake City. He was a practitioner of plural marriage and had four wives and fifteen children.

References
 Andrew Jenson. Latter-day Saint Biographical Encyclopedia 3:746; 4:370.
 Andrew Jenson. Encyclopedia History of The Church of Jesus Christ of Latter-day Saints p. 593.

External links
 Grampa Bill's G.A. Pages: Christian D. Fjelsted (sic)
State of Utah Death Certificate

1829 births
1905 deaths
19th-century Mormon missionaries
20th-century Mormon missionaries
American Latter Day Saints
Converts to Mormonism
Danish Latter Day Saints
Danish Mormon missionaries
Danish emigrants to the United States
Danish general authorities (LDS Church)
Mission presidents (LDS Church)
Mormon missionaries in Denmark
Mormon missionaries in Norway
Mormon missionaries in Sweden
Mormon missionaries in the United States
Mormon pioneers
People from Copenhagen
Presidents of the Seventy (LDS Church)